Amoy Street is a street in the Wan Chai area of Hong Kong Island, Hong Kong. It connects Johnston Road in the north to Queen's Road East in the south. Amoy is an old name of the Chinese city of Xiamen. It has been described as "shy and retiring" by Time Out because it is a cul-de-sac with steps at one end.

History
Amoy Street was opened on Marine Lot 40. Its first purchaser was MacVicar & Co. which used the lot on the former shore as warehouse. Prior to that, there was once a pier named Burn's Pier, and a sugar refinery. As part of a planned urban renewal scheme in 2008, local residents expressed concern over increased environmental noise and traffic.

Features
 The shophouse at No. 6 Amoy Street was built in 1948.
 The buildings Nos. 186–190 Queen's Road East are located at the corner of Queen's Road East and Amoy Street. They are tong-laus built in the 1930s, and are now listed as Grade III historic buildings.

References

External links
 

Wan Chai

Roads on Hong Kong Island